Michiel Jonckheere (born 3 January 1990) is a Belgian footballer.

External links
 
 

1990 births
Living people
Belgian footballers
Belgium youth international footballers
K.V. Oostende players
K.V. Kortrijk players
Belgian Pro League players
Challenger Pro League players
Association football defenders